Chrysogone Cyrille Rose (13 February 1830 in Lestrem, Pas-de-Calais – 1902 in Meaux) was an important French clarinetist, and served as principal clarinet at the Paris Opera. He was a teacher and composer of pedagogical material for the clarinet, much of which is still widely in use today.

Cyrille's teacher was Hyacinthe Klosé. He studied under Klosé at the Paris Conservatoire, winning the First Prize in 1847.

He taught many famous clarinet players, such as:

 Louis Cahuzac
 Paul Jeanjean
 Manuel Gomez
 Francisco Gomez
 Henri Lefèbvre
 Henri Paradis
 Henri Selmer
 Alexandre Selmer

References

External links 
 
 Recording of Rose's 32 Etudes by Sean Osborn

French classical clarinetists
People from Pas-de-Calais
1830 births
1902 deaths
Conservatoire de Paris alumni
Academic staff of the Conservatoire de Paris
Chevaliers of the Légion d'honneur
19th-century classical musicians